The Amherstview Jets are a Canadian Junior ice hockey team based in Amherstview, Ontario, Canada.  As of the 2016/17 hockey season they play in the Provincial Junior Hockey League  of the Ontario Hockey Association. Prior to that they were members of the Empire B Junior C Hockey League.  This league became the Tod Division (East Conference) of the Provincial Junior Hockey League.

History
The Amherstview Jets originated in the 1970s as the Ernestown Jets, in the Township of Ernestown, Ontario, now known as the Township of Loyalist, Ontario.  Amherstview is a community within Loyalist Township.  The Jets originated as a member of the Quinte-St. Lawrence Junior C Hockey League.

In 1982, the Ernestown Jets changed their names to the Ernestown Dynamiters.  In 1984, as the Quinte-St. Lawrence league was in decline, the Ernestown franchise went on hiatus.  The Quinte-St. Lawrence league fell apart in 1986 and merged with the Central Ontario Junior C Hockey League to the West and left the franchise without a local league to join.

In 1989, the Eastern Ontario Junior C Hockey League was founded.  The Ernestown Jets were resurrected and joined the upstart league that season.

The first two seasons for the Jets were both losing seasons, but the 1991-92 season saw Ernestown finish the season in second place with seventeen wins in a thirty-game season.  The Jets went on to win the league championship under the guidance of Coach Randy Stewart.

In 1995, the Eastern Ontario Junior C Hockey League became the Empire B Junior C Hockey League to avoid further confusion with Ottawa District Hockey Association's Eastern Ontario Junior C Hockey League.

In 1999, after ten seasons as the Ernestown Jets, the Jets changed their name to become the Amherstview Jets.

The 2004-05 season ended with the Amherstview Jets in third place, in the end they were league champions.  They moved on to the Clarence Schmalz Cup provincial quarter-final.  Their opponent in the quarter-final was the Central Ontario Junior C Hockey League's Uxbridge Bruins.  The Bruins swept the Jets 4-games-to-none.

In 2005-06, the Jets finished the regular season in second place.  In the league quarter-final, the Jets were put up against the winless Frontenac Flyers, whom they swept 3-games-to-none.  In the league semi-final, the Jets drew the Campbellford Rebels.  In the end, the Jets were victorious winning the series 4-games-to-1.  In the league final, the Jets came up against the top seeded Napanee Raiders.  After a long, hard-fought series, the Raiders won game 7 to win the series and the league championship 4-games-to-3.

In 2006-07, the Jets again finished in second place.  With no quarter-final round this year, the Jets were automatically placed in the semi-final.  The Jets drew the Napanee Raiders and gained some measure of revenge over them for the result of the previous years final with a 4-games-to-2 series win.  In the Final, the Jets drew the Colborne Cobras, that season's top rated team.  The series went the distance with the Jets coming out victorious in the end with a 4-games-to-3 series victory (The Jets rallied from a 3-games-to-0 deficit).  In the provincial quarter-final, the Jets came up against the Central Ontario Junior C Hockey League's Lakefield Chiefs.  The Chiefs proved to be too much as the Jets lost the series 4-games-to-2.

Season-by-season results

Notable alumni
Bryan Allen
Jay McKee

External links
Amherstview Jets

Empire Junior C Hockey League teams